Hockey Club Bagtyyarlyk, also known as Burgut, is a Turkmenian professional ice hockey team based in Ashgabat, Turkmenistan. Is the command of the State sport Committee of Turkmenistan. It was founded in 2007.

History 
The team was founded in 2007 and was named "Burgut" (Eagle). The head coach of the team was Turkmen Suleiman Durdyyev. They team played at the Ice Palace in Ashgabat. Several players from the team also played for the Turkmenistan national team. In 2012, the team won USD$20,000 at the first President of Turkmenistan Cup tournament. From April 20 to May 5, 2012 by order of the President of Turkmenistan, the team went to Kazan to attend the Ak Bars Kazan youth hockey school.

Since 2013 the team has been known as "Bagtyýarlyk". They play in the Turkmenistan Hockey Championship.

References

2007 establishments in Turkmenistan
Ice hockey clubs established in 2007
Ice hockey teams in Turkmenistan
Sport in Turkmenistan